Moro is a district in Northern Papua New Guinea in the Madang region. As of 2016, its population is 6,310,129.

References 

Papua New Guinea
Madang Province